The  were Christians who were persecuted for their faith in Japan, mostly during the 17th century.

Early Christianity in Japan 
Christian missionaries arrived with Francis Xavier and the Jesuits in the 1540s and briefly flourished, with over 100,000 converts, including many daimyōs in Kyushu. The shogunate and imperial government at first supported the Catholic mission and the missionaries, thinking that they would reduce the power of the Buddhist monks, and help trade with Spain and Portugal. However, the Shogunate was also wary of colonialism, seeing that the Spanish had taken power in the Philippines, after converting the population. It soon met resistance from the highest office holders of Japan. Emperor Ogimachi issued edicts to ban Catholicism in 1565 and 1568, but to little effect. Beginning in 1587 with imperial regent Toyotomi Hideyoshi’s ban on Jesuit missionaries, Christianity was repressed as a threat to national unity. After the Tokugawa shogunate banned Christianity in 1620, it ceased to exist publicly. Many Catholics went underground, becoming , while others lost their lives. Only after the Meiji Restoration, was Christianity re-established in Japan.

The first group of martyrs, known as the Twenty-Six Martyrs of Japan (1597), were canonized by the Church in 1862 by Pope Pius IX. The same pope beatified the second group, known as the 205 Martyrs of Japan (1598–1632), in 1867.

16 Martyrs of Japan (1633–1637)
Another group of martyrs were investigated by the Vatican Curia's Congregation for the Causes of Saints (CCS) in 1980 and were beatified on 18 February 1981. Pope John Paul II canonized these 16 Martyrs of Japan as saints on 18 October 1987. This group is also known as Lorenzo Ruiz, Dominic Ibáñez de Erquicia Pérez de Lete, Iacobus Tomonaga Gorōbyōe, and 13 companions.

Ordained Martyrs

Dominican Priests

Foreign Missionaries 
 Dominic Ibáñez de Erquicia Pérez de Lete – 14 August 1633
 Antonio Gonzalez – 24 September 1637
 Jordan Ansalone – 17 November 1634
 Luke of the Holy Spirit Alonso Gorda – 19 October 1633
 Michael de Aozaraza – 29 September 1637
 Guillaume Courtet – 29 September 1637

Japanese 
 Jacobo Kyushei Gorōbyōe Tomonaga de Santa María – 17 August 1633
 Thomas Rokuzayemon – 15 November 1634
 Vincent Shiwozuka – 29 September 1637

Martyred Laity

Dominican Laity

Japanese Cooperator Brother 
 Francis Shōyemon – 14 August 1633
 Matthew Kohioye – 19 October 1633

Foreign Missionaries – Confraternity of the Holy Rosary 
 Lorenzo Ruiz – 29 September 1637

Japanese Tertiaries 
 Marina of Omura – 11 November 1634.  A woman who assisted the missionaries in Japan, she was arrested in 1634 and burned alive.
 Magdalene of Nagasaki – 16 October 1634

Christian Laity

Japanese Catechist 
 Michael Kurobioye – 17 August 1633

Japanese 
 Lazarus of Kyoto – 29 September 1637

See also

Martyrs of Japan
Twenty-Six Martyrs Museum and Monument
Christianity in Japan
Roman Catholicism in Japan
Nanban trade

Notes

External links
The 26 Martyrs Museum in Nagasaki City, Japan
Catholic Bishops Conference of Japan: Timeline of the Catholic Church in Japan
Daughters of St. Paul Convent, Tokyo, Japan: Prohibition of Christian religion by Hideyoshi and the 26 martyrs
 
The Japanese Martyrs
Nagasaki Wiki: Detailed Access Information from Nagasaki Station to 26 Martyrs Monument
2008 Beatification of Japanese Martyrs
 Kirish'tan:  Heaven's Samurai,  a historical novel that includes the story of the Twenty-six Martyrs
Britto, Francis. All About Francis Xavier
Litterae Apostolicae Praedicatorum Fratrum

Catholic martyrs of the Early Modern era
Roman Catholic child saints
Japanese Roman Catholic saints
Martyrs
Executed children
1630s in Japan
Martyred groups
Persecution by Buddhists
People executed by Japan
Martyrs
Groups of Roman Catholic saints
 Martyrs
Lists of Christian martyrs
Lists of saints
Beatifications by Pope John Paul II
Canonizations by Pope John Paul II